"Hi-Fly" (also sometimes spelled "Hi Fly" or "High Fly") is one of the best known compositions by pianist Randy Weston, written in the 1950s and inspired by his experience of being 6 feet 8 inches tall, "and how the ground looks different to you than everybody else". Since first being recorded on 1958's New Faces at Newport, "Hi-Fly" appears on several other albums by Weston, including Live at the Five Spot (1959), Niles Littlebig (1969), Tanjah (1973), Perspective (with Vishnu Wood, 1976), Rhythms and Sounds (1978), Earth Birth (1995), Zep Tepi (2005), and The Storyteller (2009).

Jon Hendricks wrote lyrics to the song, recorded first in 1959 on the album The Hottest New Group in Jazz and also appearing on 1961's High Flying With Lambert, Hendricks & Ross. Among others who have recorded vocal covers are Abbey Lincoln (on The World Is Falling Down, 1991), Mel Tormé (on 1962's Comin' Home Baby! and other albums), Karin Krog on (Hi-Fly with Archie Shepp) and Sarah Vaughan (In the City of Lights, 1999).

Selected covers
Now a jazz standard, "Hi-Fly" has been recorded in many versions by other leading musicians, including: 
Eddie "Lockjaw" Davis: Smokin′, 1958
Lambert, Hendricks & Ross: The Hottest New Group in Jazz, 1959
Art Blakey & the Jazz Messengers: At the Jazz Corner of the World, 1959 
Cannonball Adderley Quintet: The Cannonball Adderley Quintet in San Francisco, featuring Nat Adderley, 1959
Slide Hampton Octet: Sister Salvation, 1960
Lambert, Hendricks & Ross: High Flying With L, H & R, 1961
The Jazztet (Art Farmer and Benny Golson): Big City Sounds, 1961
Johnny Coles: The Warm Sound, 1961
Jaki Byard: Hi-Fly, 1962
Lionel Hampton: Many Splendored Vibes, 1962
Al Grey: Snap Your Fingers, featuring Billy Mitchell, 1962
Cannonball Adderley: Phenix, 1975
Horace Parlan: No Blues, 1975
Archie Shepp with Karin Krog: Hi-Fly, 1976
Eric Dolphy: Berlin Concerts, 1977 
Horace Parlan: Hi-Fly, 1978
Dexter Gordon: Gotham City, 1981
Shelly Manne: Goodbye for Bill Evans, 1981
Ted Dunbar: Jazz Guitarist, 1982
George Shearing with Mel Tormé: Top Drawer, 1983
Peter King: Hi-Fly, 1984 
Monty Alexander: Full Steam Ahead, 1985
Rio Nido: Hi Fly, 1985
Max Roach Double Quartet: Bright Moments, 1985
Donald Byrd: Harlem Blues, 1988
Art Taylor: Mr. A.T., 1992
Jimmy Smith: Damn!, 1995
Ron Carter: So What, 1998
Ray Bryant: Ray's Tribute to His Jazz Piano Friends, 1998
Sarah Vaughan: In the City of Lights, 1999
Ahmad Jamal: A Quiet Time, 2009
Tom Brantley: Boneyard, 2009

References

External links
 "Randy Weston - "Hi-Fly"", YouTube.

1950s jazz standards
Songs with lyrics by Jon Hendricks
Mel Tormé songs
Bebop jazz standards
Compositions by Randy Weston
1958 songs